George Andrew Romero (February 4, 1940 – July 16, 2017) was an American-Canadian filmmaker, writer, editor and actor. His Night of the Living Dead series of films about an imagined zombie apocalypse began with the 1968 film of the same name and is often considered a major contributor to the image of the zombie in modern culture. Other films in the series include Dawn of the Dead (1978) and Day of the Dead (1985). Aside from this series, his works include The Crazies (1973), Martin (1977), Knightriders (1981), Creepshow (1982), Monkey Shines (1988), The Dark Half (1993), and Bruiser (2000). He also created and executive-produced the television series Tales from the Darkside from 1983 to 1988.

Romero is often described as an influential pioneer of the horror film genre and has been called the "Father of the Zombie Film" and an "icon".

Early life 
Romero was born on February 4, 1940, in the New York City borough the Bronx, the son of Anne Romero (Dvorsky) and George Romero, a commercial artist. His mother was Lithuanian, and his father was from Spain but had immigrated to Cuba as a child. His father has been reported as being born in A Coruña, with his family coming from the Galician town of Neda, although Romero once described his father as of Castilian descent.

Raised in the Bronx, he would frequently ride the subway into Manhattan to rent film reels to view at his house. He was one of only two people who repeatedly rented the opera-based film The Tales of Hoffmann; the other was future director Martin Scorsese. Romero attended Carnegie Mellon University in Pittsburgh.

Career

1960s 

After graduating from college in 1960, Romero began his career shooting short films and TV commercials. One of his early commercial films was a segment for Mister Rogers' Neighborhood in which Fred Rogers underwent a tonsillectomy. With nine friends, including screenwriter John A. Russo, Romero formed Image Ten Productions in the late 1960s. This is the production company that produced Night of the Living Dead (1968). Directed by Romero and co-written with John A. Russo, the movie became a cult classic and a defining moment for modern horror cinema.

Among the inspiration for Romero's filmmaking, as told to Robert K. Elder in an interview for The Film That Changed My Life, was the British film, The Tales of Hoffmann (1951), from the Powell and Pressburger team.

1970s and 1980s 

The three films that Romero created that followed Night of the Living Dead: There's Always Vanilla (1971), Jack's Wife / Season of the Witch (1972) and The Crazies (1973) were not as well received as Night of the Living Dead or some of his later work. The Crazies, dealing with a bio spill that induces an epidemic of homicidal madness, and the critically acclaimed arthouse success Martin (1978), a film that deals with the vampire myth, were the two well-known films from this period.

Romero returned to the zombie genre in 1978 with Dawn of the Dead. Shot on a budget of $1.5 million, the film earned over $55 million internationally and was later named one of the top cult films by Entertainment Weekly in 2003. He made the third entry in his "Dead Series" with Day of the Dead in 1985.

Between these two films, Romero shot Knightriders (1981), another festival favorite about a group of modern-day jousters who reenact tournaments on motorcycles; and Creepshow (1982), written by Stephen King, an anthology of tongue-in-cheek tales modeled after 1950s horror comics. The cult-classic success of Creepshow led to the creation of Romero's Tales from the Darkside, a horror anthology television series that aired from 1983 to 1988. As the decade drew to a close, Romero directed Monkey Shines (1988), about a service animal.

1990s 

Romero updated his original screenplay and executive-produced the 1990 remake of Night of the Living Dead directed by Tom Savini for Columbia/TriStar. Savini is also responsible for the makeup and special effects in many of Romero's films including Dawn of the Dead, Day of the Dead, Creepshow, and Monkey Shines.

The early nineties also featured directorial efforts Two Evil Eyes (a.k.a. "Due occhi Diabolici", 1990), an Edgar Allan Poe adaptation in collaboration with Dario Argento and The Dark Half (1993) from a novel written by Stephen King. In 1991, he made a cameo appearance in Jonathan Demme's Academy Award-winning The Silence of the Lambs (1991) as one of Hannibal Lecter's jailers

In 1994, Romero shot a short film, Jacaranda Joe, about people running into a community of Bigfoot. Filmed at Valencia College in Florida, it was the first film that Romero shot entirely outside of Pittsburgh.

In 1998, Romero produced and directed an unaired pilot about Professional wrestling entitled Iron City Asskickers. It was eventually released on DVD and vintage VHS in 2021.

In 1998, he directed a live-action commercial promoting the video game Resident Evil 2 in Los Angeles. The 30-second advertisement featured the game's two main characters, Leon S. Kennedy (portrayed by actor Brad Renfro) and Claire Redfield (Adrienne Frantz), fighting a horde of zombies while in Raccoon City's police station. The project was obvious territory for Romero; the Resident Evil series has been heavily influenced by the "Dead Series". The commercial was popular and was shown in the weeks before the game's actual release, although a contract dispute prevented it from being shown outside Japan. Capcom was so impressed with Romero's work, it was strongly indicated that Romero would direct the first Resident Evil film. He declined at first — "I don't wanna make another film with zombies in it, and I couldn't make a movie based on something that ain't mine" — although in later years, he reconsidered and wrote a script for the first movie. It was eventually rejected in favor of Paul W. S. Anderson's version.

In the mid 90's, he wrote a script for a film adaptation of the first original Goosebumps book Welcome to Dead House. It also introduce a villain in this version and his name's Foster DeVries. It was eventually rejected altogether, although Romero's screenplay is kept archived by The University of Pittsburgh.

2000s 

2000 saw the release of Bruiser, about a man whose face becomes a blank mask. Universal Studios produced and released a 2004 remake of Dawn of the Dead, with which Romero was not involved. Later that year, Romero kicked off the DC Comics title Toe Tags with a six-issue miniseries titled The Death of Death. Based on an unused script that Romero had written for his "Dead Series", the comic miniseries concerns Damien, an intelligent zombie who remembers his former life, struggling to find his identity as he battles armies of both the living and the dead. Typical of a Romero zombie tale, the miniseries includes ample supply of both gore and social commentary (dealing particularly here with corporate greed and terrorism — ideas he would also explore in his next film in the series, Land of the Dead). Romero has stated that the miniseries is set in the same kind of world as his Dead films, but featured other locales besides Pittsburgh, where the majority of his films take place.

Romero, who lived in Toronto, directed a fourth Dead movie in that city, Land of the Dead, released in 2005. The movie's working title was "Dead Reckoning". Actors Simon Baker, Dennis Hopper, Asia Argento, and John Leguizamo starred and the film was released by Universal Pictures (who released the Dawn of the Dead remake the year before). The film received generally positive reviews.

Romero collaborated with the game company Hip Interactive to create a game called City of the Dead, but the project was canceled midway due to the company's financial problems.

In June 2006, Romero began his next project, called Zombisodes. Broadcast on the Internet, it is a combination of a series of "Making of" shorts and story expansion detailing the work behind the 2007 film George A. Romero's Diary of the Dead. Shooting began in Toronto in July 2006.

In August 2006, The Hollywood Reporter made two announcements about Romero, the first being that he would write and direct a film based on a short story by Koji Suzuki, author of Ring and Dark Water, called Solitary Isle and the second announcement pertaining to his signing on to write and direct George A. Romero's Diary of the Dead, which follows a group of college students filming a horror movie who proceed to film the events that follow when the dead rise.

After a limited theatrical release, Diary of the Dead was released on DVD by Dimension Extreme on May 20, 2008, and later to Blu-ray on October 21, 2008.
Shooting began in Toronto in September 2008 on Romero's Survival of the Dead (2009). The film was initially reported to be a direct sequel to Diary of the Dead, but the film features only Alan van Sprang, who appeared briefly as a rogue National Guard officer, reprising his role from the previous film, and did not retain the first-person camerawork of Diary of the Dead. The film centers on two feuding families taking very different approaches in dealing with the living dead on a small coastal island. The film premiered at the 2009 Toronto International Film Festival. Prior to the May 28, 2010, theatrical release in the United States, Survival of the Dead was made available to video on demand and was aired as a special one-night showing on May 26, 2010, on HDNet.

Some critics have seen social commentary in much of Romero's work. They view Night of the Living Dead as a film made in reaction to the turbulent 1960s, Dawn of the Dead as a satire on consumerism, Day of the Dead as a study of the conflict between science and the military, Land of the Dead as an examination of class conflict, Diary of the Dead as a film made in reaction to the "emerging media" and Survival of the Dead as a study on war and conflict.

2010s 

In 2010, Romero was contacted by Claudio Argento to direct a 3D remake of his younger brother Dario Argento's film, Deep Red (1975). Claudio was expected to write the screenplay and told Romero that his brother would also be involved. Romero, who showed interest in the project, decided to contact his longtime friend Dario only to find out that Dario was unaware of a remake and Romero ended up declining Claudio's offer. Romero stated that he had plans for two more "Dead" movies which would be connected to Diary of the Dead and they would be made depending on how successful Survival of the Dead was. Romero, however, said that his next project would not involve zombies and he was going for the scare factor, but offered no further details.

Romero made an appearance in the second downloadable map pack called "Escalation" for the video game Call of Duty: Black Ops. He appears as himself in the zombies map "Call of the Dead" as a non-playable enemy character. Romero is featured alongside actors Sarah Michelle Gellar, Danny Trejo, Michael Rooker, and Robert Englund, all of the four being playable characters. He is portrayed as a powerful "boss" zombie armed with a movie studio light.

In 2012, Romero returned to video games recording his voice for "Zombie Squash" as the lead villain, Dr. B. E. Vil. "Zombie Squash HD Free" game was released by ACW Games for the iPad in November 2012.

In 2014, Marvel Comics began releasing Empire of the Dead, a 15-issue miniseries written by Romero. The series is broken up into three acts, five issues each, and features not only zombies but also vampires. In May 2015, it was announced at Cannes that the production company Demarest was developing the comic series into a TV series. The series was to be written and executive-produced by Romero and Peter Grunwald.

In May 2017, Romero announced plans for 2 upcoming zombie films, the first one was George A. Romero Presents: Road of the Dead, a film that he co-wrote with Matt Birman, who would direct the film making it Romero's second zombie-themed film that he did not direct himself. Romero and Birman along with Matt Manjourides and Justin Martell will produce the film. Birman was the second unit director on Land of the Dead, Diary of the Dead and Survival of the Dead. Birman pitched the idea to Romero ten years earlier, saying the movie is like The Road Warrior meets Rollerball at a NASCAR race, with significant inspiration from Ben-Hur and that "the story is set on an island where zombie prisoners race cars in a modern-day Coliseum for the entertainment of wealthy humans".

On July 13, 2017, Romero released the first poster for Road of the Dead and discussed the plot for the movie saying "it's set in a sanctuary city where this fat cat runs a haven for rich folks, and one of the things that he does is stage drag races to entertain them," Romero told Rue Morgue. "There's a scientist there doing genetic experiments, trying to make the zombies stop eating us, and he has discovered that with a little tampering, they can recall certain memory skills that enable them to drive in these races. It's really The Fast and the Furious with zombies". Romero died three days later leading to reports questioning if the film will ever be made. In 2020, Birman announced that he would finish the film as a tribute-like film to Romero and renamed it, "Wolfe Island". A prequel comic book series based on Romero's Road of the Dead was announced by IDW in July 2018. The 3-part mini-series was released in December 2018.

The second zombie film he announced was titled "Twilight of the Dead". He penned a film treatment with co-writer Paolo Zelati depicting a conclusion to the series that explains the fate of the zombie protagonists from Land of the Dead and an ending where humanity has become virtually extinct. Romero had written the beginning of the script, but the project was stalled when Romero died of lung cancer in 2017.

It was announced in April 2021 that the film had been put back into development under the supervision of Suzanne Romero, with Zelati finishing the script with screenwriters Joe Knetter and Robert L. Lucas. Suzanne told The Hollywood Reporter, "This is the film he wanted to make. And while someone else will carry the torch as the director, it is very much a George A. Romero film."

Personal life 
Romero was married three times. He married his first wife, Nancy, in 1971. They divorced in 1978. They had one child together, Cameron, who later became a filmmaker.

Romero met his second wife, actress Christine Forrest, on the set of Season of the Witch (1973), and they married in 1981. She had bit parts in most of his films. They had two children together, Andrew and Tina Romero. The couple divorced in 2010 after three decades of marriage.

Romero met Suzanne Desrocher while filming Land of the Dead (2005), and they married in September 2011 at Martha's Vineyard and lived in Toronto. He acquired Canadian citizenship in 2009, becoming a dual Canada-U.S. citizen.

Death 
On July 16, 2017, Romero died following a "brief but aggressive battle with lung cancer", according to a statement by his longtime producing partner, Peter Grunwald. Romero died while listening to the score of one of his favorite films, The Quiet Man, with his wife, Suzanne Desrocher Romero, and daughter from his second marriage, Tina Romero, at his side.

Influences 
Romero ranked his top ten films of all time for the 2002 Sight & Sound Greatest Films Poll. They are The Brothers Karamazov, Casablanca, Dr. Strangelove, High Noon, King Solomon's Mines, North by Northwest (a film on which a teenaged Romero worked as a gofer), The Quiet Man, Repulsion, Touch of Evil and The Tales of Hoffmann. Romero listed the films in alphabetical order, with special placement given to Michael Powell's The Tales of Hoffmann, which he cites as "my favorite film of all time; the movie that made me want to make movies".

Filmography

Awards and nominations 
On October 27, 2009, Romero was honored with the Mastermind Award at Spike TV's Scream 2009. The tribute was presented by longtime Romero fan Quentin Tarantino, who stated in his speech that the "A" in George A. Romero stood for "A Fucking Genius".

Legacy 
Regarded as the "Godfather of the Dead" and the "father of the modern movie zombie", critic Owen Gleiberman said of Romero that he was "a maestro of zombie terror who created the ultimate horror-movie metaphor" and remarked "that the real metaphor isn’t only about Vietnam, or capitalism, or even disease, or anything else that you can stuff into a fortune cookie. It’s about something more basic but ethereal, something that you can sense without putting it into words: the hidden aggression we all feel deep down, as the price of too much civilization." 

In 2010, writer and actor Mark Gatiss interviewed Romero for his BBC documentary series A History of Horror, in which he appears in the third episode. Los Angeles Times. Romero's influence, and that of Night of the Living Dead, is widely seen among numerous filmmakers and artists, in particular those who have worked in the zombie subgenre, including comics writer Robert Kirkman, novelist Seth Grahame-Smith, and filmmakers John Carpenter, Edgar Wright and Jack Thomas Smith.

The season eight premiere episode "Mercy" of the zombie-based show The Walking Dead, the first to air after Romero's death, dedicated the episode to Romero; showrunner Scott M. Gimple said that the show "owes a great debt" to Romero for his impact on popular culture.

In October 2017, the video game Dying Light included a mural of George A. Romero near one of the many in-game safehouses.

In May 2019, the University of Pittsburgh announced it had acquired George Romero's archives and that a multimedia exhibit be created and open to the public in the university's Hillman Library.

In September 2019, the Call of Duty: Black Ops 4 Zombies map "Tag der Toten" pays homage to Romero by including his pair of glasses that the player can interact with, each character giving remorse for his passing. The map is a re-imagining of the Call of Duty: Black Ops map "Call of the Dead", which Romero made an appearance on. The name of the map is German for Day of the Dead, which is a reference to Romero's movie of the same name.

The George A. Romero Non-Profit Foundation 
The George A. Romero Foundation is a nonprofit organization dedicated to preserving and promoting Romero's legacy. Founded in 2018 by Romero's wife Suzanne Desrocher-Romero, the Foundation's mission is to advance the causes for which George Romero was a champion – creativity within the horror genre and independent filmmaking in general – as well as preserving and documenting the history of the genre in all forms and contributing to its future by encouraging new generations of filmmakers, artists, and creators.

Bibliography 
 Dawn of the Dead (with Susan Sparrow; movie tie-in), 1979.
 Martin (with Susan Sparrow; movie tie-in), 1984.
 Toe Tags #1-6 ("The Death of Death"; DC Comics), 2004–2005.
 Empire of the Dead (Marvel Comics), 2014–2015.
 Nights of the Living Dead co-edited by  Jonathan Maberry and George Romero (St. Martin's Griffin), 2017.
 The Living Dead (with Daniel Kraus), 2020.

Forewords written by Romero 
 Bizarro! by Tom Savini (foreword), 1984. 
 Book of the Dead edited by John Skipp and Craig Spector (foreword), 1989.
 ZOMBIES! An Illustrated History of the Undead Foreword by George A. Romero.
 The Extraordinary Adventures of Dog Mendonça and Pizzaboy II – Apocalipse by Filipe Melo and Juan Cavia (foreword), 2011.

References

Further reading 
 Ork, William Terry and Abagnalo, George, "Night of the Living Dead--Interview with George A. Romero," Interview Magazine 1(4) (1969), 21-22.
 Dupuis, Joachim Daniel (2014), George A. Romero and the zombies, Autopsy of a living-dead. Paris: L'Harmattan (in French).

External links 

 
 George A. Romero Archival Collection
 
 George Romero on Find A Grave
 New York Times short bio 
 Senses of Cinema: Great Directors Critical Database
 George Romero @ THE DEUCE: Grindhouse Cinema Database
 
 

Interviews
 
 Simon Pegg interviews George A. Romero
 "Speaking of the Dead" – An interview with George A Romero (July 2009)

1940 births
2017 deaths
American emigrants to Canada
American male film actors
American male television actors
American male voice actors
American people of Spanish descent
Hispanic and Latino American film directors
American people of Galician descent
American people of Lithuanian descent
American writers of Cuban descent
Anti-consumerists
Articles containing video clips
Canadian male film actors
Canadian male television actors
Canadian male voice actors
Canadian film directors
Canadian people of Cuban descent
Canadian people of Lithuanian descent
Canadian people of Spanish descent
Carnegie Mellon University College of Fine Arts alumni
Deaths from cancer in Ontario
Deaths from lung cancer
Film directors from New York City
Hispanic and Latino American writers
Horror film directors
Naturalized citizens of Canada
People from the Bronx
Burials at Toronto Necropolis
Postmodernist filmmakers